Diospyros malabarica, the gaub tree, Malabar ebony, black-and-white ebony or pale moon ebony, is a species of flowering tree in the family Ebenaceae that is native to the Indian Subcontinent and South East Asia.

It is a long-lived, very slow-growing tree, which can reach up to 35 m in height with a black trunk up to 70 cm in diameter. It is an evergreen tree with white or green flowers. The tree is found in lowland rainforests, primarily along rivers and streams.

Fruit
The fruits are round, and yellow when ripe. It may be somewhat often astringent, even when ripe. Its common name is derived from the coast of southwestern India, Malabar. It is the provincial tree of Ang Thong Province in Thailand.

Uses
Both the bark of the tree and the unripe fruit have medicinal uses in Ayurveda. This tree was mentioned as Tinduka by Sanskrit writers.

Unripe leaves and fruits were traditionally used to dye cloth black.

The wood is sometimes used in guitar manufacturing for its distinctive patterns.

References

External links

Diospyros malabarica (Desr.) Kostel. var. malabarica
Diospyros malabarica - Ayurvedic medicinal plants

malabarica
Flora of tropical Asia
Plant dyes
Plants used in Ayurveda